Ludgate is a surname. Notable people with the surname include:

 Percy Ludgate (1883–1922), Irish designer of an early Analytical Engine
 William Ludgate (1836–1912), United States Army soldier
 April Ludgate, character on the American television series Parks and Recreation, played by Aubrey Plaza